Jennifer O'Donnell (born October 12, 1973) is an American archer. She competed in the women's individual and team events at the 1992 Summer Olympics.

References

External links
 

1973 births
Living people
American female archers
Olympic archers of the United States
Archers at the 1992 Summer Olympics
People from Farmington, Michigan
Pan American Games medalists in archery
Pan American Games gold medalists for the United States
Pan American Games silver medalists for the United States
Archers at the 1991 Pan American Games
Medalists at the 1991 Pan American Games
21st-century American women